History of the Eagles – Live in Concert was a concert tour by the American rock band the Eagles. It was launched in conjunction with the release of the 2013 documentary History of the Eagles. The tour visited North America and Europe between 2013 and 2014 as well as Oceania in early 2015. It began in Louisville, Kentucky at the KFC Yum! Center and concluded on July 29, 2015 in Bossier City, Louisiana. The tour included Bernie Leadon, who was in the original line-up of the band, and would have also included Randy Meisner, but he was too ill to perform at the time. Don Felder was, however, excluded because of ongoing lawsuits against the group, despite settling them in 2007. It was the last tour to involve Glenn Frey before his death in 2016.

Critical reception
Howard Cohen from Miami.com praised the performance in Miami, noting the "harmonies – pristine, soaring and spot-on —uncannily have remained as peerless as they were on the original recordings." Jim Harrington from San Jose Mercury News gave a mixed review of the performance in San Jose, writing the show "was a very educational, and sometimes interesting, affair – but I'm not sure I'd want to take the course again." Francis Pelliccario from The Lantern gave a positive review of the show in Columbus, writing the band "brought the show back down to earth with the true meaning of rock 'n’ roll."

Set list

This setlist is the average setlist as calculated by setlist.fm. The vast majority of shows on this tour follow this setlist exactly, although there are some slight variations. "How Long" was played at six shows, "Dirty Laundry" was played at five shows, and "Seven Bridges Road" was played once. "How Long" and "Dirty Laundry" were played at unrelated shows with very different setlists that took place at the same time as the tour.

"Saturday Night"
"Train Leaves Here This Morning"
"Peaceful Easy Feeling"
"Witchy Woman"
"Doolin–Dalton"
"Tequila Sunrise"
"Doolin-Dalton/Desperado (Reprise)"
"Already Gone"
"Best of My Love"
"Lyin' Eyes"
"One of These Nights"
"Take It to the Limit"
"Pretty Maids All in a Row"
"I Can't Tell You Why"
"New Kid in Town"
"Love Will Keep Us Alive"
"Heartache Tonight"
"Those Shoes"
"In the City"
"Life's Been Good"
"The Long Run"
"Funk #49"
"Life in the Fast Lane"

Encore
"Hotel California"
Encore 2
"Take It Easy"
 "Rocky Mountain Way"
 "Desperado"

Tour dates

Band members

Eagles

Glenn Frey – vocals, guitar, keyboards
Don Henley – vocals, drums, guitar, percussion
Joe Walsh – vocals, guitar, keyboards
Timothy B. Schmit – bass guitar, vocals, harmonica
Bernie Leadon – guitar, banjo, vocals

Additional musicians

Scott Crago – drums, percussion
Will Hollis – keyboards, percussion, vocals
Steuart Smith – guitar, vocals, mandolin
Michael Thompson – keyboards, vocals
Richard F.W. Davis – keyboards, percussion, vocals

Notes

References

2013 concert tours
2014 concert tours
Eagles (band)
2015 concert tours